Zamites is a genus of sterile foliage known from the Mesozoic of North America, Europe and India through the Eocene of North America. It was erected as a form taxon for leaves that superficially resembled the extant cycad Zamia, however it is now believed to belong to a similar but phylogenetically different group, the cyacadeoids (Bennettitales). The fronds are linear or lanceolate in shape, and pinnately compound, with pinnae with parallel veins and smooth margins, and symmetrical and constricted at the base where they are attached obliquely to the upper surface of the rachis. It has been interpreted as a Bennettitalean plant in the family Williamsoniaceae. It is associated with the ovulate cone Williamsonia and male cone Weltricihia.

As explained by Zijlstra & van Konijnenburg-van Cittert (2020), the application of the genus name Zamites has over time drifted away from Brongniart's original concept to one where the species Z. gigas (Lindl. & Hutton) Morris has been treated as a de facto type, to the degree that none of Brongniart's four original species would now be assigned to it, instead being allocated to Otozamites and possibly elsewhere; this includes Z. bucklandii, designated as the type of Zamites by Pfeiffer in a publication dating from 1871-1875, but now (as O. bucklandii) the type of Otozamites. Technically, unless otherwise addressed, this renders Otozamites a synonym of Zamites and would mean that Z. gigas plus all the species recognisably closer to it than to Z. bucklandii would require a new genus name. Zijlstra & van Konijnenburg-van Cittert chose to attempt to circumvent this situation by proposing that Zamites should be re-defined based on designating Z. gigas as a new type to replace Z. bucklandii, a proposal that was recommended for acceptance by the Nomenclature Committee for Fossils in 2022.

Species 
Species include:
 Z. arcticus
 Z. bayeri
 Z. californica
 Z. mariposana

Distribution 
Fossils of Zamites have been found in:

Triassic (to Jurassic)
Antarctica, Austria, China, France, Germany, Honduras, Hungary, Italy, Japan, Mexico, Romania, Tajikistan, Ukraine, and the United States (New Mexico, North Carolina, Utah, Virginia, Virginia/North Carolina).

Jurassic (to Cretaceous)
Antarctica, Argentina, Azerbaijan, Belarus, Chile, China, Colombia (Valle Alto Formation, Caldas), Egypt, France, Georgia, Germany, Iran, Italy, Japan, Kazakhstan, Mexico, Mongolia, Portugal, Romania, the Russian Federation, Serbia and Montenegro, Switzerland, Tajikistan, Turkey, Ukraine, the United Kingdom, and the United States (Montana, Wyoming).

Cretaceous
Canada (Alberta, British Columbia), Ecuador, Japan, Mexico, South Africa, Spain, and the United States (Montana, Virginia, Wyoming).

Eocene
United States (California)

References 

Bennettitales
Triassic first appearances
Triassic plants
Jurassic plants
Early Cretaceous plants
Late Cretaceous plants
Paleocene plants
Eocene plants
Eocene genus extinctions
Mesozoic trees
Mesozoic Antarctica
Mesozoic life of Asia
Mesozoic life of Europe
Mesozoic life of North America
Cretaceous Canada
Jurassic Mexico
Cretaceous Mexico
Jurassic United States
Cretaceous United States
Mesozoic life of South America
Prehistoric plants of South America
Jurassic Argentina
Fossils of Argentina
Jurassic Chile
Fossils of Chile
Jurassic Colombia
Fossils of Colombia
Cretaceous Ecuador
Fossils of Ecuador
Fossil taxa described in 1828
Fossils of Serbia